Michael Peterson is the debut studio album by the American country music artist of the same name. Released in 1997 on Reprise Records, it features the singles "Drink, Swear, Steal & Lie", "From Here to Eternity", "Too Good to Be True", "When the Bartender Cries" and "By the Book", all of which charted on the Billboard Hot Country Singles & Tracks (now Hot Country Songs) charts. "From Here to Eternity" was a Number One on that chart in late 1997.

Allmusic critic Thom Owens gave the album three stars out of five, calling it an "engaging set of contemporary country, highlighted by Peterson's warm, welcoming voice." Alanna Nash of Entertainment Weekly gave it a "B" rating, saying that the production was "lightweight" but that Peterson's performance and the song selection made it "a feel-good dance album."

Track listing

Personnel
As listed in liner notes.
Michael Black - background vocals 
Patrick Reilly - bass guitar
Max Carl - background vocals
Dan Dugmore - steel guitar
Thom Flora - background vocals
Larry Franklin - fiddle
Paul Franklin - steel guitar
Rob Hajacos - fiddle
John Hobbs - keyboards
Dann Huff - electric guitar
Josh Leo - electric guitar
Brent Mason - electric guitar
Greg Morrow - drums
Nashville String Machine - strings
Craig Nelson - bass guitar
Robert Ellis Orrall - background vocals
Michael Peterson - lead vocals, acoustic guitar
Tom Roady - percussion
Scotty Sanders - steel guitar
Darrell Scott - acoustic guitar, mandolin
Biff Watson - acoustic guitar
Crowd noise on "Love's Great": Steven Bliss, Pat "The Sergeant" Finch, Chad Gates, Curtis Green, Rick Henegar, Rusty Jones, Dillon Leo, Brooke Lundy, Susan E. Niles, Jake Orrall, Jamin Orrall, Justine Orrall, Amanda Peterson, Lauren Peterson, Gene Pistilli, Steve Pope, Annie Price, Michael Puryear, Gavin Reilly, Arlos Smith, Neal Spielberg, Peter "Boston" Strickland.

Charts

Weekly charts

Year-end charts

Certifications

References

1997 debut albums
Michael Peterson (singer) albums
Reprise Records albums
Albums produced by Josh Leo